Tenontosaurus is a genus of medium- to large-sized ornithopod dinosaur. It had an unusually long, broad tail, which like its back was stiffened with a network of bony tendons.

The genus is known from the late Aptian to Albian ages of the Early Cretaceous period sediments of western North America, dating between 115 and 108 million years ago. It contains two species, Tenontosaurus tilletti (described by John Ostrom in 1970) and Tenontosaurus dossi (described by Winkler, Murry, and Jacobs in 1997). Many specimens of T. tilletti have been collected from several geological formations throughout western North America. T. dossi is known from only a handful of specimens collected from the Twin Mountains Formation of Parker County, Texas.

History of discovery

The first Tenontosaurus fossil was found in Big Horn County, Montana by an American Museum of Natural History (AMNH) expedition in 1903. Subsequent digs in the same area during the 1930s unearthed 18 more specimens, and four specimens were found during the 1940s. Despite the large number of fossil specimens, the animal was not named or scientifically described during this time, though Barnum Brown of the AMNH gave it the informal name "Tenantosaurus", "sinew lizard", in reference to the extensive system of stiffening tendons in its back and tail.

During the 1960s, Yale University began an extensive, long-term dig in the Big Horn Basin area (Cloverly Formation) of Montana and Wyoming. The expedition was led by John Ostrom, whose team discovered more than 40 new specimens. Following his expedition, Ostrom became the first to describe and name the animal, calling it Tenontosaurus, a slight variation in spelling of Brown's informal name.

Since 1970, many more Tenontosaurus specimens have been reported, both from the Cloverly and other geological formations, including the Antlers Formation in Oklahoma, Paluxy Formation of Texas, Wayan Formation of Idaho, Cedar Mountain Formation of Utah, and Arundel Formation of Maryland.

Classification
 
The cladogram below follows an analysis by Butler et al, 2011.

Paleobiology

Diet

Plant life in the Tenontosaurus ecosystem was likely dominated by ferns and tree ferns, cycads, and possibly primitive flowering plants. Larger plants and trees were represented by gymnosperms, such as conifer and ginkgo trees. Tenontosaurus was a low browser, and an adult would have had a maximum browsing height of about  if it adopted a bipedal stance. This restricted Tenontosaurus, especially juveniles, to eating low-growing ferns and shrubs. Its powerful, U-shaped beak and the angled cutting surfaces of its teeth, however, meant it was not limited to which part of the plant it consumed. Leaves, wood, and even fruit may have formed part of its diet.

Predators
 
Teeth and a number of skeletons belonging to the carnivorous theropod Deinonychus have often been discovered associated with Tenontosaurus tilletti remains. Tenontosaurus specimens have been found at over 50 sites, and 14 of those also contain Deinonychus remains. According to one 1995 study, only six sites containing Deinonychus fossils contain no trace of Tenontosaurus, and Deinonychus remains are only rarely found associated with other potential prey, like Sauropelta. In all, 20% of Tenontosaurus fossils are found in close proximity to Deinonychus, and several scientists have suggested that this implies Deinonychus was the major predator of Tenontosaurus. Adult Deinonychus, however, were much smaller than adult Tenontosaurus, and it is unlikely a single Deinonychus would have been capable of attacking a fully grown Tenontosaurus. While some scientists have suggested that Deinonychus must therefore have been a pack hunter, this view has been challenged based on both a supposed lack of evidence for coordinated hunting (rather than mobbing behavior as in most modern birds and reptiles, though crocodilians have been documented to hunt cooperatively on occasion) as well as evidence that Deinonychus may have been cannibalizing each other, as well as the Tenontosaurus, in a feeding frenzy. It is likely that Deinonychus favored juvenile Tenontosaurus, and that when Tenontosaurus reached a certain size, it passed out of range as a food source for the small theropods, though they may have scavenged larger individuals, or preyed on adults that were sick or injured. The fact that most Tenontosaurus remains found with Deinonychus are half-grown individuals supports this view. It also lived in the same area as the large carnivorous dinosaur Acrocanthosaurus.

Reproduction
 
The presence of medullary bone tissue in the thigh bone and shin bone of one specimen indicates that Tenontosaurus used this tissue, today only found in birds that are laying eggs, in reproduction. Additionally, like Tyrannosaurus and Allosaurus, two other dinosaurs known to have produced medullary bone, the tenontosaur individual was not at full adult size upon her death at 8 years old. Because the theropod line of dinosaurs that includes Allosaurus and Tyrannosaurus diverged from the line that led to Tenontosaurus very early in the evolution of dinosaurs, this suggests that dinosaurs in general produced medullary tissue and reached reproductive maturity before maximum size. A histological study showed that T. tilletti grew quickly early in life and during sub-adult ontogeny, but grew very slowly in the years approaching maturity, unlike other iguanodontians.

Paleoecology
 
Throughout the Cloverly Formation, Tenontosaurus is by far the most common vertebrate, five times more abundant than the next most common, the ankylosaur Sauropelta. In the arid Little Sheep Mudstone Member, Tenontosaurus is the only herbivorous dinosaur, and it shared its environment with the common predator Deinonychus as well as an indeterminate species of allosauroid theropod and goniopholid crocodile. After the major climate shift at the beginning of the Himes Member in the mid-Albian age, several more dinosaurs entered the region, including the less common ornithopod Zephyrosaurus, the oviraptorosaur Microvenator, and an indeterminate species of titanosauriform sauropod and ornithomimid. The ecological community in the tropical stage also included the small mammal Gobiconodon, turtles such as Glyptops, and species of lungfish. 
 
The ecological community was similar in other regions, with dinosaurs like Tenontosaurus and Deinonychus as the most common large vertebrates. The Antlers Formation stretches from southwest Arkansas through southeastern Oklahoma and into northeastern Texas. This geological formation has not been dated radiometrically. Scientists have used biostratigraphic data and the fact that it shares several of the same genera as the Trinity Group of Texas, to surmise that this formation was laid down during the Albian stage of the Early Cretaceous Period, approximately 110 mya. The area preserved in this formation was a large floodplain that drained into a shallow inland sea. Several million years later, this sea would expand to the north, becoming the Western Interior Seaway and dividing North America in two for nearly the entire Late Cretaceous period. The paleoenvironment of the Antlers Formation consisted of tropical or sub-tropical forests, floodplains, river deltas, coastal swamps, bayous and lagoons, probably similar to that of modern-day Louisiana. In the Antlers Formation in what is now Oklahoma, Tenontosaurus and Deinonychus shared their paleoenvironment with other dinosaurs, such as the sauropods Astrodon (Pleurocoelus) and Sauroposeidon proteles, and the carnosaur Acrocanthosaurus atokensis, which was likely the apex predator in this region.Brinkman, Daniel L.; Cifelli, Richard L.; & Czaplewski, Nicholas J. (1998). "First occurrence of Deinonychus antirrhopus (Dinosauria: Theropoda) from the Antlers Formation (Lower Cretaceous: Aptian – Albian) of Oklahoma". Oklahoma Geological Survey Bulletin 146: 1–27. The most common dinosaur in the paleoenvironment preserved in this formation is Tenontosaurus. Other vertebrates present at the time of Tenontosaurus included the amphibian Albanerpeton arthridion, the reptiles Atokasaurus metarsiodon and Ptilotodon wilsoni, the crurotarsan reptile Bernissartia, the cartilaginous fish Hybodus buderi and Lissodus anitae, the ray-finned fish Gyronchus dumblei, the crocodilian Goniopholis, and the turtles Glyptops and Naomichelys.Cifelli, R. Gardner, J.D., Nydam, R.L., and Brinkman, D.L. 1999. Additions to the vertebrate fauna of the Antlers Formation (Lower Cretaceous), southeastern Oklahoma. Oklahoma Geology Notes 57:124-131. Possible indeterminate bird remains are also known from the Antlers Formation. The fossil evidence suggests that the gar Lepisosteus was the most common vertebrate in this region. The early mammals known from this region include Atokatherium boreni and Paracimexomys crossi.

Climate
In the Cloverly Formation of Montana and Wyoming, Tenontosaurus remains are common in two distinct rock units: the more ancient Little Sheep Mudstone Member (Cloverly Formation unit V) and the more recent Himes Member (units VI and VII). The oldest part of the formation, the Pryor Conglomerate, contains no Tenontosaurus fossils, and they only appear in the uppermost, most recent part of the Little Sheep Mudstone Member. Catherine Forster, in a 1984 paper on the ecology of Tenontosaurus, used this as evidence to suggest that Tenontosaurus populations did not arrive in the Bighorn Basin area until the time of the late Little Sheep Mudstone Member.

At the time Tenontosaurus first appeared in Wyoming and Montana (the early Albian age), the regions climate was arid to semi-arid, dry, with seasonal periods of rainfall and occasional droughts. However, during a period of a few million years, the climate in the region shifted to one of increased rainfall, and the environment became subtropical to tropical, with river deltas, floodplains, and forests with swampy inlets reminiscent of modern Louisiana, though marked dry seasons persisted to create savannah-like environments as well. The change in rainfall levels is likely due to the advancing shoreline of the Skull Creek Seaway, a cycle of the Western Interior Seaway which, later in the Cretaceous period, would completely divide North America.

This dramatic shift in climate coincided with an apparent increase, rather than decrease, in the abundance of Tenontosaurus. This shows Tenontosaurus'' to have been a remarkably adaptable animal, which persisted for a long span of time in one area despite changes to its environment.

References

External links

Early Cretaceous dinosaurs of North America
Fossil taxa described in 1970
Iguanodonts
Taxa named by John Ostrom
Paleontology in Montana
Ornithischian genera